Balram Jakhar (23 August 1923 – 3 February 2016) was an Indian politician, who served as the Speaker of the Lok Sabha and Governor of Madhya Pradesh. He was also the longest serving Speaker of the Lok Sabha.

Early life and education
Jakhar was born in a HinduJat family in Panjkosi village of Fazilka district in Punjab now in Fazilka on 23 August 1923. His father was Chaudhari Rajaram Jakhar and his mother was Pattodevi Jakhar. Jakhar earned a degree in Sanskrit from Forman Christian College, Lahore, in 1945. He had knowledge of English, Punjabi, Urdu, Sanskrit and Hindi languages.

Politician
A lifelong member of the Congress party, Jakhar founded the Bharatiya Krishak Samaj, a farmers' organization, in 1965. He was elected to the Punjab Legislative Assembly in 1972 and was re-elected in 1977, becoming the Leader of the Opposition.

Jakhar then moved to national politics. He was elected in 1980 to the seventh Lok Sabha from Ferozepur and in 1984 to the eighth Lok Sabha from Sikar. He had the distinction of being elected Speaker of the Lok Sabha during his very first term in the house. Furthermore, served twice as Speaker of Lok Sabha, a rare achievement in Indian parliament history, holding office from 1980 to 1989, thus became the longest serving speaker in history. As Speaker of Lok Sabha, he promoted automation and computerization of Parliamentary works. He promoted Parliament library, reference, research, documentation and information services for the knowledge and use of members of Parliament. The establishment of Parliament Museum was his contribution. He was the first Asian to be elected Chairman of the Commonwealth Parliamentarian Executive Forum. 

The Sikar parliamentary seat was won by Devi Lal in the elections of 1989. In 1991, Jakhar was again elected to parliament from the Sikar constituency and his party returned to power in India. Jakhar was made Union Agriculture minister under Prime Minister P. V. Narasimha Rao in 1991.

After the Congress party returned to power in 2004, he was appointed Governor of Madhya Pradesh and served from 30 June 2004 to 30 May 2009.

Personal life
Jakhar was born into an affluent land-owning ] Hindu Jat family. His father was Chaudhari Rajaram Jakhar and his  mother was Pattodevi Jakhar. Balram Jakhar was the father of three sons:
Sajjan Kumar Jakhar, the eldest son, is a former minister in the Punjab government. Father of Ajay Vir Jakhar.
Ajay Vir Jakhar, son opf Sajjan Kumar Jakhar, is Chairman of Bharat Krishak Samaj, a farmer organization, and writes frequently on farmer issues in reputed newspapers.
Surinder Jakhar, second son, died of a self-inflicted bullet injury (probably accidental) in 2011, duringesigning  the lifetime of his father. Surinder served as chairman of Asia’s cooperative fertiliser giant IFFCO for four terms and chief of Asian Cooperative Alliance for two terms. Surinder is the father of Sandeep Jakhar.
 Sandeep Jakhar, son of Surinder Jakhar, is one of very few candidates who managed to win on a Congress party ticket in the Punjab assembly election of 2022. 
Sunil Jakhar, youngest son. Before resigning from the party in 2022, Sunil was long a member of his father's Congress party. He is a three time MLA from Abohar. He became Leader of the Opposition in Punjab in March 2012. He was elected to parliament from Gurdaspur in 2017 and was made President of his party's Punjab unit the same year. He left the party on 14th May 2022 after receiving a show-cause notice for criticizing Ambika Soni for incompetence, partisanship and communal bigotry after the party lost the state assembly elections earlier that year. Ambika Soni, herself a convert from Sikhism to Christianity, had blocked Sunil Jakhar from being projected as future chief minister during the eler.ction campaign on the ground that he was not a Sikh but a Hindu, saying that Punjab would never accept a Hindu chief minister.

References

External links

|-

|-

|-

|-

|-

1923 births
2016 deaths
People from Fazilka district
Indian National Congress politicians
Speakers of the Lok Sabha
Governors of Gujarat
Governors of Madhya Pradesh
Forman Christian College alumni
Punjab, India MLAs 1972–1977
Punjab, India MLAs 1977–1980
India MPs 1984–1989
India MPs 1998–1999
Lok Sabha members from Rajasthan
People from Sikar
Lok Sabha members from Punjab, India
Leaders of the Opposition in Punjab, India
Agriculture Ministers of India
India MPs 1991–1996
People from Firozpur district
People from Bikaner district
India MPs 1980–1984